Jason McGuinness (born 8 August 1982) is an Irish footballer.

Career
McGuinness played at youth level for Tolka Rovers, Sheriff Y.C. and Bohemians before graduating to the Bohs first team, making his league debut as a substitute against UCD in August 2002. He made his Irish Under 21 debut four days later in an international against Finland.

With the likes of Colin Hawkins and Ken Oman in his way of regular first team football, he joined rivals Shamrock Rovers and spent 2 seasons scoring 7 goals in 57 total appearances there where he established himself at the heart of their defence before re-joining Bohs in time for the 2006 season.

McGuinness formed a great partnership with Liam Burns which played a big part in Bohs' great defensive record as they marched to 2008 Premier Division title, winning it by a record-breaking 19 points from St Patricks Athletic. Whilst participating in 2008's UEFA Intertoto Cup, he scored in both rounds, against Rhyl and FK Riga.

Jason started the season well but was fined two weeks' wages and suspended for five games in May 2009 after racially abusing Benin captain Romuald Boco during a game between Sligo Rovers and Bohemians on 5 May 2009. On his return, he struggled to find form and lost his place to Ken Oman. He also missed Bohs' EA Sports Cup final win over Waterford United in the September but did pick up his second league winners medal in a row as Bohs finished top of the table ahead of their rivals Shamrock Rovers.

Despite putting in a superb performance in the Setanta Sports Cup Final, Jason and Bohemians had a disappointing 2010 season where the club lost their league title on goal difference and failed to make an impact in Europe where they made an embarrassing exit to Welsh side The New Saints.

When McGuinness' contract expired at the end of the 2010 season, Bohemians were unable to offer new contracts due to financial troubles and Jason was released from the club. On 25 January McGuinness signed a one-year contract with Sligo Rovers.

He scored against FC Spartak Trnava in the 2012–13 UEFA Europa League

McGuinness signed once again for The Hoops in November 2012.

McGuiness signed for another of the big 4 Dublin clubs, St Patrick's Athletic, on 11 November 2014  before being released In June 2016.

Cliftonville
The day after his release, it was announced McGuinness had joined the NIFL Premiership with Cliftonville where he scored against AEK Larnaca FC in the 2016–17 UEFA Europa League

Honours
League of Ireland: 3
 Bohemians – 2008, 2009
 Sligo Rovers – 2012
FAI Cup: 1
 Sligo Rovers – 2011
League of Ireland Cup: 2
 Bohemians – 2009
 St Patrick's Athletic – 2015
Setanta Sports Cup: 2
 Bohemians – 2009–10
 Shamrock Rovers – 2013
Leinster Senior Cup: 1
 Shamrock Rovers – 2013

External links
McGuinness punished for racial slur

References

1982 births
Association footballers from County Dublin
Republic of Ireland association footballers
League of Ireland players
Bohemian F.C. players
Shamrock Rovers F.C. players
Sligo Rovers F.C. players
St Patrick's Athletic F.C. players
Republic of Ireland under-21 international footballers
Association football central defenders
Living people
Tolka Rovers F.C. players
Cliftonville F.C. players
NIFL Premiership players